Joseph-Marion Leandré (born 9 May 1945) is a Haitian football midfielder who played for Haiti in the 1974 FIFA World Cup. He also played for Racing CH. His younger brother, Fritz, was also a professional player.

References

External links
FIFA profile

1945 births
Haitian footballers
Haiti international footballers
Association football midfielders
Racing CH players
Ligue Haïtienne players
1974 FIFA World Cup players
Living people